A crash cover is a philatelic term for a type of cover (including the terms air accident cover, interrupted flight cover, wreck cover), meaning an envelope or package that has been recovered from an air crash, train wreck, shipwreck or other accident. Crash covers are a type of interrupted mail.

Crashes of flights carrying airmail were a regular occurrence from the earliest days of mail transport by air. In many cases of aircraft crashes, train wreck and shipwrecks, it was possible to recover some or even all of the mail being carried, with perhaps some charring around the edges of some pieces if there had been a fire, or water damage from flying boat crashes or shipwrecks. In such cases, the authorities typically apply a postal marking (cachet), label, or mimeograph that gets affixed to the cover explaining the delay and damage to the recipient, and possibly enclose the letter in an "ambulance cover" or "body bag" if it was badly damaged and then send it to its intended destination.

Aviation-related crash covers are a specialized collecting area of aerophilately and are much-prized items of postal history, because they are generally rare, but as tangible artifacts of often-tragic accidents they have a story to tell. The 367 covers salvaged from the Hindenburg disaster are especially desirable, with prices ranging from US$10,000 and up; a cover at the Corinphila auction in May 2001 realized 85,000 Swiss francs (US$75,000).

The American Air Mail Society has a Crash Cover Committee specializing in the study of crash covers. There is also a Wreck & Crash Mail Society, whose members collect all types of crash and wreck covers.

References and sources
Notes

Sources

External links

 American Air Mail Society
 Collecting Air Crash Covers - Metropolitan Air Post Society
 Hindenburg disaster covers United States National Postal Museum
 Hindenburg Crash Mail - the Scout Covers
 The Wreck & Crash Mail Society

Philatelic terminology
Postal history
Disasters